The 1982 World Women's Curling Championship, the women's world curling championship, was held from March 16–21 at the Patinoire des Vernets in Geneva, Switzerland.

Teams

Round-robin standings

Round-robin results

Draw 1

Draw 2

Draw 3

Draw 4

Draw 5

Draw 6

Draw 7

Draw 8

Draw 9

Tiebreakers

Round 1

Round 2

Playoffs

Semifinals

Final

External links

World Women's Curling Championship
1982 in women's curling
International sports competitions hosted by Switzerland
Sports competitions in Geneva
1982 in Swiss women's sport
20th century in Geneva
Women's curling competitions in Switzerland
March 1982 sports events in Europe